Dr. Ahmed Abdulla Didi (born 1 October 1966) is the 4th Chief Justice of the Maldives, serving from June 28, 2018 till December 8th, 2019.

Early life
Dr. Ahmed Abdhulla Didi was born in S. Hithadhoo, Republic of Maldives on 1 October 1966.

Education & Career
After completing Secondary Certificate of Al-Azhar at Cairo Preparatory and Secondary Institute, he completed his bachelor's degree in Sharia & Law at Al-Azhar University in 1993.

Prior to his appointment to Supreme Court of the Maldives in 2010, he worked at Attorney General's office as Deputy Attorney General from 2008 to 2009 as well as Counsel General of the People's Majlis in 2010.

He was nominated to Supreme Court by President Mohamed Nasheed and the Majlis confirmed his nomination on August 10, 2010.

After Chief Justice Abdulla Saeed was disqualified from Supreme Court bench on June 20, 2018, President Abdulla Yameen nominated Justice Abdulla Didi as the new Chief Justice, his nomination was confirmed by the Majlis on June 28, 2010.

References

Maldivian judges
Qazis of the Maldives
Living people
1966 births
Al-Azhar University alumni
Maldivian expatriates in Egypt